J.-B. Martin's old weaving factory (French: "Ancienne manufacture de moulinage J-B. Martin") is a historic building in Tarare, Rhône, France. The silk-weaving company was founded in 1843, and the buildings, designed by architect Eugène-Toussaint Cateland, were completed in 1860. They were abandoned in 1939, in the midst of World War II. It has been listed as an official historical monument since October 29, 1987.

References

Buildings and structures in Rhône (department)
Commercial buildings completed in 1860
1843 establishments in France
Companies established in 1843
1939 disestablishments in France
Monuments historiques of Auvergne-Rhône-Alpes
19th-century architecture in France